European route E 90 is an A-Class West–East European route, extending from Lisbon in Portugal in the west to the Turkish–Iraqi border in the east. It is connected to the M5 of the Arab Mashreq International Road Network.

Itinerary 
The E 90 routes through five European countries, and includes four sea-crossings: Barcelona, Spain - Mazara del Vallo, Italy; Messina, Italy to Reggio Calabria, Italy; Brindisi, Italy, to Igoumenitsa, Greece, and Eceabat, Turkey, to Çanakkale, Turkey.

: Lisbon - Setúbal (Start of concurrency with ) - Landeira (End of concurrency with )
: Landeira - Évora (Start of concurrency with ) - Estremoz (End of concurrency with ) - Elvas

: Badajoz - Mérida - Madrid
: Madrid
: Zaragoza
: Zaragoza - Lleida - El Vendrell
: El Vendrell (Start of concurrency with ) - Rubí (End of concurrency with )
: Rubí - Barcelona
: Barcelona
: Barcelona
: Barcelona

Gap
 Barcelona -  Mazara del Vallo

: Mazara del Vallo - Alcamo - Palermo (Towards )
: Palermo (Towards ) - Campofelice di Roccella
: Campofelice di Roccella - Messina
: Messina - Villa San Giovanni
: Villa San Giovanni - Reggio Calabria
: Reggio Calabria
: Reggio Calabria - Catanzaro - Crotone - Sibari - Metaponto - Taranto
: Taranto - Brindisi
: Brindisi

Ferry
  Brindisi -  Igoumenitsa

The Greek portion of E90 is known as Egnatia Odos, after the road built on top of a pre-Roman trail that spanned from the Adriatic to the Aegean, Via Egnatia. It was later extended to Byzantium (Constantinople) to the east and Rome to the west. The name Egnatia comes from the Roman proconsul, Gnaius Egnatius, who built the original road. In its design phase, Egnatia Odos was planned to have 1650 bridges, 43 river crossings, 11 railway crosses, and 50 interchanges with existing roads.
: Igoumenitsa - Ioannina (Towards ) - Kalabaka - Kozani - Thessaloniki - Komotini - Kipoi

: İpsala - Keşan
: Keşan (Start of concurrency with ) - Gelibolu (End of concurrency with )
: Gelibolu - Lapseki 
: Lapseki - Karacabey (Start of concurrency with ) - Bursa
: Bursa (End of concurrency with )
: Bursa 
: Bursa - Eskişehir - Sivrihisar - Ankara
: Ankara
: Ankara - Aksaray - Ulukışla
: Ulukışla
: Ulukışla - Tarsus
: Tarsus - Adana
: Adana - Toprakkale - Gaziantep - Şanlıurfa
: Şanlıurfa - Nusaybin ( Qamishli) - Cizre
: Cizre - Silopi

: Zakho

References

External links 
 UN Economic Commission for Europe: Overall Map of E-road Network (2007)

 
90
E090
E090
E090
E090
E090